= Flora Montiberica =

- Discipline: Botany
- Language: English
- Edited by: Gonzalo Mateo Sanz

Publication details
- History: 1995-present
- Publisher: Jolube Consultor Botánico y Editor (Spain)
- Frequency: Triannual
- Open access: Yes

Standard abbreviations
- ISO 4: Fl. Montiber.

Indexing
- ISSN: 1138-5952
- ISSN: 1988-799X

Links
- Journal homepage

Flora Montiberica is a Spanish scientific journal of botany. It was established in 1995. It publishes studies in Spanish and English.

== Scope ==
Flora Montiberica accepts studies in various fields of botany. It covers primarily Mediterranean taxa, particularly those from the Iberian Peninsula.
